Lorraine Clifford-Lee (born 22 September 1981) is an Irish Fianna Fáil politician who has served as a Senator since June 2020.

She was nominated by the Taoiseach to become a Senator in June 2020, having previously been selected from the 2016 to 2020 Cultural and Educational Panel.

Early and personal life
Clifford-Lee was born in Waterford in 1981. She attended Our Lady of Mercy in Waterford and later studied at University College Cork where she became the Irish Officer on the Students Union.

She lives in Donabate with her husband John Lee and her daughter and son. Her husband, who is 10 years her senior, is the political editor of the Irish Mail on Sunday newspaper.

She is a self-employed solicitor and is a fluent Irish speaker.

Political career

2016 general election
After Clifford-Lee unsuccessfully contested a local election for a seat in the Pembroke-South Dock ward of Dublin City Council in 2015, she was selected, along with Darragh O'Brien, to be one of two Fianna Fáil candidates for the Dublin Fingal constituency in the 2016 general election. Clifford-Lee was selected to run in Dublin Fingal to ensure Fianna Fáil complied with gender quota rules.

The decision to add Clifford-Lee to the ticket was criticised by party insiders as tokenism and gratuitous. Darragh Butler, a long-time local Fianna Fáil councillor, stating "due to gender quotas we are being overlooked in favour of a candidate who has no track record, no history and up to now, no visibility in the constituency."

In the lead up to the election Clifford-Lee claimed that members of her team were intimidated by supporters of her running mate Darragh O'Brien while they were canvassing in Portmarnock. O'Brien denied knowledge of this but said that tempers can get a little frayed so close to polling day.

She was an unsuccessful candidate for the Dublin Fingal constituency polling 3,359 (5.6%) of first preferences and was eliminated on the ninth count, while her running mate Darragh O'Brien was elected on the first count, topping the poll.

On her election to the Seanad, she was appointed as the Fianna Fáil Seanad Spokesperson for Justice, Children and Youth Affairs. In November 2018, she was appointed Deputy Leader of the Opposition in the Seanad.

2019 by-election
Clifford-Lee was a candidate in the 2019 Dublin Fingal by-election to fill the seat vacated following Independents 4 Change's Clare Daly election to the European Parliament in May 2019.

Racist tweets scandal
At the start of the campaign, multiple tweets emerged where Clifford-Lee appeared to make derogatory and xenophobic comments portraying negative and xenophobic attitudes towards foreigners, Irish Travellers as well as ableist and body shaming tweets about females.

She was forced to apologise the tweets from 2011. She refused calls to stand down as a candidate, claiming she was the victim of a smear campaign, while Fianna Fáil did not discipline her.

By-election result
There was a record low turn out for the constituency of 25.59% and the seat was won by the Green Party. Clifford-Lee received 18.5% of the first preference votes, coming second, and was eliminated on the final count.

2020 general election
She was also an unsuccessful candidate for Dublin Fingal at the 2020 general election. She lost her seat at the 2020 Seanad election, but was restored to Seanad Éireann after being nominated by the Taoiseach Micheál Martin, her party leader, in June 2020.

References

External links
Lorraine Clifford-Lee's page on the Fianna Fáil website

1981 births
Living people
Irish solicitors
Members of the 25th Seanad
21st-century women members of Seanad Éireann
Politicians from County Dublin
Fianna Fáil senators
Members of the 26th Seanad
Nominated members of Seanad Éireann
People from Waterford (city)
Alumni of University College Cork